The 1952 World Table Tennis Championships were held in Bombay from 1 to 10 February 1952.The 1952 World Championships were marked by the arrival of the Japanese as a Table Tennis force on the world scene. In another first the Chief Referee of the tournament was an Indian,  Professor Arakalgud Subbarao.

India was chosen as the hosts for the event in March 1950 at the Congress of the International Table Tennis Federation in Budapest, Hungary.
Because the Championships were held in India the entry was reduced. Czechoslovakia, Yugoslavia, Austria and Sweden were all unable to travel to the tournament.

Medalists

Team

Individual

References

External links
ITTF Museum

 
World Table Tennis Championships
World Table Tennis Championships
World Table Tennis Championships
Table tennis competitions in India
International sports competitions hosted by India
World Table Tennis Championships